Burscough is a civil parish in the West Lancashire district of Lancashire, England.  It contains 38 buildings that are recorded in the National Heritage List for England as designated listed buildings.  Of these, two are at Grade II*, the middle grade, and the others are at Grade II, the lowest grade.  The parish contains the large village of Burscough, the rural hamlet of Tarlscough, and the surrounding countryside.  Passing through the parish is the Leeds and Liverpool Canal, and the junction between the canal and its Rufford Branch is in the parish.  Also passing through the parish are the railways of the Ormskirk - Preston and the Manchester-Southport Lines, which cross in the parish.  The oldest listed buildings are farmhouses and farm buildings, and houses and cottages.  Associated with the canal are the structures at the junction, bridges and a lock.  Associated with the railways are station buildings and a bridge.  The other listed buildings include churches, a war memorial, and a former mill and its offices.


Key

Buildings

Notes and references

Notes

Citations

Sources

Lists of listed buildings in Lancashire
Buildings and structures in the Borough of West Lancashire